Kuusvesi is a medium-sized lake of Central Finland, in Laukaa Municipality. It belongs to the Kymijoki main catchment area. The inflow to the lake Kuusvesi is Simunankoski rapids and the outflow is Tarvaalanvirta rapids, which are protected by the rapid protection program of Finland.

References

See also
List of lakes in Finland

Lakes of Laukaa